An Tae-hyun (born 1 March 1993) is a South Korean footballer who plays as midfielder for Jeju United in the K League 1.

Career
An Tae-hyun signed with Seoul E-Land before the 2016 season. He made 31 appearances and scored 3 goals in his debut season.

An moved to Bucheon FC 1995 on 3 January 2017.

References

External links 

1993 births
Living people
Association football midfielders
South Korean footballers
Seoul E-Land FC players
Bucheon FC 1995 players
Gimcheon Sangmu FC players
K League 1 players
K League 2 players
Hongik University alumni